Douglas Marques dos Santos (born May 18, 1985, in São Paulo), simply known as Douglas or Douglas Santos, is a Brazilian central defender. He currently plays for XV de Novembro.

Career
Made professional debut for Atlético-PR in 1–2 defeat away to Paysandu in the Campeonato Brasileiro on August 13, 2005.

In December 2008 transferred on loan to Flamengo for 2009 season.

Flamengo career statistics
(Correct  July 11, 2009)

according to combined sources on the.

Honours
Flamengo
Taça Rio: 2009
Rio de Janeiro State League: 2009

Contract
Atlético-PR 1 January 2009 to 30 April 2012.

References

External links
 
  
  
 

1985 births
Living people
Brazilian footballers
Brazilian expatriate footballers
Club Athletico Paranaense players
Paulista Futebol Clube players
Joinville Esporte Clube players
Esporte Clube Santo André players
CR Flamengo footballers
Associação Desportiva São Caetano players
Grêmio Barueri Futebol players
Ventforet Kofu players
Yokohama FC players
Figueirense FC players
Ceará Sporting Club players
Centro Sportivo Alagoano players
Esporte Clube XV de Novembro (Piracicaba) players
J1 League players
J2 League players
Brazilian expatriate sportspeople in Japan
Expatriate footballers in Japan
Association football defenders
Footballers from São Paulo